Paratherina is a genus of sailfin silversides endemic to the Indonesian island of Sulawesi.

Species
The currently recognized species in this genus are:
 Paratherina cyanea Aurich, 1935
 Paratherina labiosa Aurich, 1935
 Paratherina striata Aurich, 1935
 Paratherina wolterecki Aurich, 1935

References 

 
Telmatherininae
Freshwater fish of Sulawesi
Taxonomy articles created by Polbot